Herman Suizo (born 19 January 1959) is a Filipino long-distance runner. He competed in the men's marathon at the 1992 Summer Olympics.

References

1959 births
Living people
Athletes (track and field) at the 1992 Summer Olympics
Filipino male long-distance runners
Filipino male marathon runners
Olympic track and field athletes of the Philippines
Place of birth missing (living people)
Southeast Asian Games medalists in athletics
Southeast Asian Games gold medalists for the Philippines
Competitors at the 1989 Southeast Asian Games
Competitors at the 1991 Southeast Asian Games